Poursuivante ("chaser") was a  of the French Navy.

Career 
In June 1800, Poursuivante took part in the battle of Dunkirk under commander Oreille. In 1802, she departed Flushing to ferry troops to Saint-Domingue, under capitaine de vaisseau Jean-Baptiste Philibert Willaumez. She arrived as the Haitian Revolution raged. The ships Duguay-Trouin, Annibal and Swiftsure, as well as frigate Précieuse, Infatigable were also in Haiti. General Pamphile Lacroix ordered the Blacks of the island to be drowned, and the ships started throwing the Blacks of the island overboard. Only Willaumez refused the order, arguing that “sailors of the French Navy were no executioners”.

On 18 May 1803, after the Treaty of Amiens was cancelled and war broke out between France and Great Britain. En route for Saint-Domingue with the 16-gun corvette Mignonne, she encountered a British convoy, was chased by HMS Hercule, and took part in the fights of the Blockade of Saint-Domingue. Largely outgunned, Poursuivante managed to manoeuvre behind Hercule and in the action of 28 June 1803, managed to rake her, disturbing her operations enough to be able to reach harbour. Mignonne was captured by HMS Goliath.

In October, Poursuivante reffited in Baltimore, from where she departed in March 1804. On 14 August 1804, Poursuivante captured  in a notable single-ship action off the American coast and later burnt her. During her journey back to France, Poursuivante met and evaded another British ship. Willaumez was promoted to vice-admiral on his return.

Fate
Poursuivante was converted to a hulk in Rochefort in June 1806.

References

External links 
  LE COMBAT DE LA POURSUIVANTE
  
  16 - 30 Mai 1804 

Age of Sail frigates of France
Ships built in France
Romaine-class frigates
1796 ships